Armutçuk can refer to:

 Armutçuk, Büyükorhan, a village
 the former name of Kandilli, Zonguldak